Associação Desportiva São Caetano, commonly referred to as São Caetano, is a Brazilian professional club based in São Caetano do Sul, São Paulo founded on 4 December 1989. It competes in the Campeonato Paulista Série A2, the second tier of the São Paulo state football league.

History

Founded in 1989, the club found success early, winning the Third and Second Divisions of São Paulo regional tournaments.  São Caetano rose to national prominence in 2000.

In 2000, the Brazilian national championship was contested in a rather unusual way. According to previous credentials, teams would play in the First (best teams), Second or Third Division; São Caetano played in the Second. The difference was that, after all Divisions were finished, a mini tournament would gather representatives from all of them (one team from Third Division, three from Second and twelve from First), and the winner would be the Brazilian Champion of 2000.

São Caetano was runner-up of the Second Division and qualified to the finals. Beating Fluminense, Palmeiras and Grêmio, they entered the final against Vasco da Gama. The first match ended as a draw. During the second, fans invaded the pitch and the match was suspended. Despite several claims that São Caetano should be declared champion, Vasco petitioned the league for a third match, which Vasco went on to win.

Unlike many teams that rise prominently then quickly fall back to obscurity, São Caetano had another strong campaign in 2001.  Playing a full season in the top division, they reached the final against Atlético Paranaense.  Once again they finished as the runner-up, but consecutive seasons placing well secured their reputation on a national level.

In 2002, São Caetano was finalist of Copa Libertadores, the most important tournament in South America. Again, they were runner-up, losing the final to Olimpia of Paraguay on penalties.

São Caetano had earned respect, but no titles. In 2004, São Caetano won the São Paulo State Championship, beating the upstate squad Paulista, from Jundiaí.

On October 27, 2004, while playing in a match against São Paulo, São Caetano defender Serginho suffered a fatal heart attack. As São Caetano's staff let Serginho play even knowing that he had heart problems, the club was penalized heavily by the CBF, which has since marked a decline in their performance.

At the end of the 2006, they finished within the relegation zone, and played in the 2007 Brasileirão B. They remained there until 2013, when the team finished in 19th place and was relegated to Série C after 14 years in the top two divisions of Brazil. In the same year, the team was relegated in the São Paulo state championship, relegated to the Paulista Serie A2. In 2014, the team would begin the season with lackluster performance in the 2nd level of the state championship, in which the team only escaped relegation in the last round. Following a lacklustre season, the team was relegated once again from the national Série C, and would compete in the Série D in 2015.

After an unsuccessful campaign in the Serie D, the club would play only in the state leagues. However, after finishing the 2018 Campeonato Paulista in 7th place, they qualified for the 2019 Serie D.

Current squad

Out on loan

Notable matches

 São Caetano 4–1 São Paulo – 2007 Campeonato Paulista – Second Semi-Finals
 São Caetano 2–0 Club América – 2002 Libertadores Cup First – Semi-Finals

Stadium

Built in 1955, São Caetano's stadium is Estádio Anacleto Campanella. Its capacity is 22,738 people.

Former coaches
Márcio Goiano
Ademir Fonseca
Toninho Cecílio
Sérgio Guedes
Antônio Carlos Zago
Guilherme Macuglia
Pintado
Sérgio Soares
Vadão
Giba
Paulo Comelli
Dorival Júnior
Levir Culpi
Estevam Soares
Muricy Ramalho
Jair Picerni
Márcio Araújo
Émerson Leão
Aílton Silva
Marcelinho Honório

Colors and nickname
The team is dubbed Azulão (Big Blue), after the shirt color.

Rivalry
The club's biggest rival is Santo André.

Honours
 Campeonato Paulista
 Winners (1): 2004

 Copa Paulista
 Winners (1): 2019

 Campeonato Paulista Série A2
 Winners (3): 2000, 2017, 2020

 Campeonato Paulista Série A3
 Winners (2): 1991, 1998

Runners-Up 
Copa Libertadores (1): 2002
Campeonato Brasileiro (2): 2000, 2001
Campeonato Paulista (1): 2007

References

External links

 Official Site
 São Caetano on Globo Esporte

Associação Desportiva São Caetano
Association football clubs established in 1989
Football clubs in São Paulo (state)
Football clubs in Brazil
São Caetano do Sul
1989 establishments in Brazil